Miquelia is a genus of plants in the family Icacinaceae found in tropical India, Southeast Asia, and the Philippines.

The genus was circumscribed by Carl Meissner in Pl. Vasc. Gen. vol.1 on page 152 in 1838. The name Miquelia is in honour of Dutch botanist Friedrich Anton Wilhelm Miquel (1811–1871), whose main focus of study was the flora of the Dutch East Indies.

Species
Species accepted by The Plant List:
Miquelia assamica (Griff.) Mast. ex B.D.Jacks.
Miquelia caudata King
Miquelia celebica Blume
Miquelia kleinii Meisn.
Miquelia philippinensis Merr.
Miquelia reticulata Merr.
Miquelia thorelii Gagnep.

References

Icacinaceae
Asterid genera